Pultenaea campbellii commonly known as New England bush-pea or ragged bush-pea, is a species of flowering plant in the family Fabaceae and is endemic to New South Wales. It is an erect shrub with linear leaves and yellow-orange flowers arranged near the ends of branchlets.

Description
The flowers are borne near the ends of the branchlets in dense groups with leaves with enlarged stipules at the base of the head.

Taxonomy and naming
Pultenaea campbellii was first formally described in 1899 by Joseph Maiden and Ernst Betche in Proceedings of the Linnean Society of New South Wales from specimens collected by John Fauna Campbell at "Grave-yard Creek, near Walcha" in 1898.

Distribution and habitat
This pultenaea grows in forest between Glen Innes and Nundle in the New England Tableland of northern New South Wales.

Conservation status
This pea was previously listed as "vulnerable" under the Australian Government Environment Protection and Biodiversity Conservation Act 1999 and the New South Wales Government Threatened Species Conservation Act 1995 but was delisted in 1999.

References

campbellii
Flora of New South Wales
Plants described in 1899
Taxa named by Joseph Maiden
Taxa named by Ernst Betche